The Tercentenary Lectures were a series of lectures held during the 300th anniversary year of the Royal Society, London in 1960.

List of lecturers

References 

Royal Society lecture series
Technology history of the United Kingdom
Tricentennial anniversaries
1960 in the United Kingdom
1960 in science